Strepsicrates rhothia is a species of moth of the family Tortricidae first described by Edward Meyrick in 1910. It is found in Taiwan, Sri Lanka, India, the Democratic Republic of the Congo, Ghana, Madagascar, Mauritius and South Africa.

Larval food plants
The caterpillar is a pest on several economically important plant crops of several families.

Psidium guajava
Psidium cattleianum
Syzygium cumini
Eugenia parkeri
Eugenia jambolana
Callistemon citrinus
Coriaria nepalensis
Woodfordia fruticosa
Eucalyptus citriodora
Eucalyptus alba
Eucalyptus camaldulensis
Eucalyptus deglupta
Eucalyptus grandis
Eucalyptus eremophylla
Eucalyptus paniculata
Eucalyptus propinqua
Eucalyptus raveretiana
Eucalyptus robusta
Eucalyptus saligna
Eucalyptus tereticornis
Eucalyptus torelliana
Eucalyptus urophylla
Mangifera indica
Melaleuca cajuputi
Melaleuca leucadendra
Melaleuca species
Derris species

References

External links
Scientific notes on the biology and life history of Strepsicrates rhothia Meyr. (Tortricidae, Lepidoptera), a pest of guava in Karachi in 1972
Major insect pests and their management in forest plantations in Sabah, Malaysia

Moths described in 1910
Eucosmini